Jason Baggott (born 12 July 1995) is a Scottish qualified, South African rugby union player for Edinburgh in the Pro14. Baggott's primary position is fly-half.

Career
Baggott made his debut for Edinburgh on 30 November 2018.

References

1995 births
Living people
Sportspeople from Cape Town
Edinburgh Rugby players
Rugby union fly-halves